Shawn Robert Hare (born March 26, 1967) is an American former professional baseball outfielder. Hare played four seasons in MLB, appearing in 64 games from 1991 to 1995 with the Detroit Tigers, New York Mets and Texas Rangers.

Professional baseball career 
Hare was signed as an undrafted free agent by the Tigers on August 28, 1988 and played in the minor leagues until making his major league debut on September 26, 1991. After playing in 24 games for the Tigers in 1991 and 1992, Hare was placed on waivers in 1994 and claimed by the Mets. With the Mets in 1994, Hare appeared in 22 games and collected 9 hits, both career highs. The following season, Hare signed with the Texas Rangers and played in 18 games with the team, before his brief MLB career came to an end. After the 1995 season, Hare played with the minor league affiliates of the St. Louis Cardinals, New York Yankees and Tigers until 1997.

1998 in the KBO 
In 1998, Hare signed with the Korea Professional Baseball Haitai Tigers. He finished the season with a .206 batting average, 14 hits, 4 base on balls, 25 strikeouts, no home runs, 3 RBIs, and 3 runs scored in 29 games and 68 at bats. Hare became famous for some comments he made before the season, one thing is "which do you want: .300 or 30 home runs?", another thing is when he asked whether the ball should be hit over the fence or out of the whole stadium to be a home run, after which he failed to hit a home run that year. The comment, meant as a joke to endear him to the Korean fans, became his most remembered moment during his time there.

After baseball
In 2000, Hare transitioned into the financial services industry. He later served as the Vice President of Wealth Management at Morgan Stanley Smith Barney in Sherman Oaks, California.

References

External links
, or Retrosheet
Pelota Binaria (Venezuelan Winter League)

1967 births
Living people
American expatriate baseball players in Canada
American expatriate baseball players in South Korea
Baseball players from St. Louis
Cardenales de Lara players
American expatriate baseball players in Venezuela
Central Michigan Chippewas baseball players
Columbus Clippers players
Detroit Tigers players
Haitai Tigers players
KBO League outfielders
Lakeland Tigers players
London Tigers players
Louisville Redbirds players
Major League Baseball outfielders
New York Mets players
Norfolk Tides players
Oklahoma City 89ers players
Texas Rangers players
Toledo Mud Hens players